2002 Malta Open is a darts tournament, which took place in Malta in 2002.

Results

References

2002 in darts
2002 in Maltese sport
Darts in Malta